Escapism is a mental diversion or "escape" from the perceived unpleasant or banal aspects of daily life. 

Escapism may also refer to:

Escapism (album), a 2013 album by Danish recording artist Fallulah
"Escapism" (Antic Cafe song), a 2005 single by Japanese band Antic Cafe
"Escapism" (Raye song), a 2022 single by British singer Raye
Escapism Travel Magazine, a New York-based travel publication
Escapism, a fictional social movement to escape the Solar System from an invading alien species, in the science fiction novel The Dark Forest

See also
Escapist (disambiguation)